This article lists the variation in Mexican unemployment statistics by state. As of the second semester of 2015, the national unemployment rate is 4.3%. The state with the lowest reported unemployment rate is Guerrero at 2%. The state with the highest unemployment rate is Tabasco at 6%.

Mexican states

See also
 List of Mexican states by HDI

General:
 Mexican economy

References

Unemployment
Unemployment
Mexico
Mexico, unemployment rate
es:Anexo:Estados de México por población
eo:Listo de Meksikaj ŝtatoj
fr:États du Mexique par population
pt:Anexo:Lista de estados do México por população